Mason Gamble (born January 16, 1986) is an American former actor. He played the eponymous comic character in the 1993 film Dennis the Menace, selected from over 20,000 children.  He played a sidekick in Wes Anderson's film Rushmore.

Education
Gamble is a doctoral candidate in environmental science, and engineering at the Institute of the Environment and Sustainability.

Filmography

References

External links

1986 births
Living people
21st-century American male actors
Actors from Oak Park, Illinois
American male child actors
American male film actors
American male television actors
Male actors from Chicago
University of California, Los Angeles alumni